The 2022–23 Kentucky Wildcats women's basketball team represents the University of Kentucky (UK) in the 2022–23 college basketball season. Led by third-year head coach Kyra Elzy, the Wildcats play home games at Memorial Coliseum as members of the Southeastern Conference.

Roster

Schedule and results

|-
!colspan=12 style=|Exhibition
|-

|-
!colspan=12 style=|Non-conference regular season

|-
!colspan=12 style=|SEC regular season

|-
!colspan=9 style=| SEC Tournament

Rankings

See also
 2022–23 Kentucky Wildcats men's basketball team

References

Kentucky Wildcats women's basketball seasons
Kentucky Wildcats
Kentucky Wildcats women's basketball
Kentucky Wildcats women's basketball